Novovorontsovka is an urban-type settlement in Beryslav Raion, Kherson Oblast, southern Ukraine. It hosts the administration of Novovorontsovka settlement hromada, one of the hromadas of Ukraine. Novovorontsovka is located on the right bank of the Kakhovka Reservoir, an artificial reservoir on the Dnieper. It has a population of

History 

It is named after the Russian nobleman and field-marshal Mikhail Vorontsov.

The settlement's Jewish population first settled here in the early 19th century. There were 1,685 Jews in the country in 1897, which is 32.5% of the total population. Most of the Jews in the area worked as artisans or retailers. The Russian Civil War and the tragedies of the revolution caused immense suffering for the Jews of Novovorontsovka. The bulk of Jews migrated from Noworonzovka to larger cities during the 1920s and 1930s in pursuit of employment and educational possibilities. Only 42 Jews were still present in the community in 1939, making about 1.1% of the total population. On August 18, 1941, German forces seized control of the town. Only twenty Jews were able to flee before German forces arrived. On September 24, 1941, the last Jews were massacred close to the village. The Red Army liberated Novovoronsovka on February 27, 1944.

During World War II, the settlement was occupied by Germany. The Germans operated a Nazi prison in the settlement.

Administrative status 
Until 18 July, 2020, Novovorontsovka was the administrative center of Novovorontsovka Raion. The raion was abolished in July 2020 as part of the administrative reform of Ukraine, which reduced the number of raions of Kherson Oblast to five. The area of Novovorontsovka Raion was merged into Beryslav Raion.

Economy

Transportation
Novovorontsovka has access to the Highway H23 which connects Kryvyi Rih and Nikopol. Another road follows the right bank of the Dnieper and connects the settlement with Beryslav with access to Kherson.

See also 

 Russian occupation of Kherson Oblast

References

Urban-type settlements in Beryslav Raion
Populated places established in the Russian Empire
Populated places established in 1795
Khersonsky Uyezd
Populated places on the Dnieper in Ukraine